L. J. Institute of Management Studies (LJMS) is a private (non-profit) management institute located in Ahmedabad, Gujarat, India. Institute is approved by All India Council for Technical Education and is the part of L.J. Group of Institutes managed by Lok Jagruti Kendra (LJK) Trust. Institute is affiliated to Gujarat Technological University.

Campus facilities

Library
The library has wide range of technical books, periodicals, reference books, handbooks, encyclopedias and Indian standards. The library has book bank facility for students.

Computing facility
Each department has its own computer center, connected with internet and printer facility.

Training and placement cell
The institute maintains a training and placement cell to help students prepare for job searches. Assistance is given to students in developing interviewing skills.

Canteen
The canteen is located at the center of the campus. This facility is available for the students and staff at competitive rates.

Student activities

Vikalp

The Case Study Forum: This involves (a) identification, analysis and discussion of case studies in every class, and (b) data collection through visits to identified industries, data analysis and case writing by students of the first year divided in groups of 12 to 15 each under the guidance of a faculty member.

CRADLE
Capability Recognition And Development Lessons for Entrepreneurship (CRADLE) provides for (a) Interactive sessions with first generation entrepreneurs, (b) workshops for development of entrepreneurship skills, Bridge Workshops, and MDP workshops, and (c) Research Projects with SMEs.

Antrapreneur
The Business Incubator for entrepreneurship development and support by means of incubation, investment and training by bringing together students and faculty and alumni of the L. J. Group of Institutes, budding entrepreneurs, industrialists and mentors from across sectors.

EXPLORE 
Excellence in Practical Learning Over Real Encounter (EXPLORE) is to expose students towards the dynamics of corporate world making them understand various business processes through direct interaction at various manufacturing as well as the service sectors.

Vimarsh 
The Forum for Group Discussion. It is an amalgamation of group discussion, debates and extempore.

Archetype 
The Management Model Competition to bring out the creativity of students by enabling them to give a physical shape to the management concepts they learn in classes.

XCEL 
eXcellent Cinema Enabled Learning (XCEL) to effect experiential learning through edutainment.

Man-Q
The Quiz Competition to provide a common platform to students to explore, hunt, build, and cultivate their knowledge bank and to strengthen their communication skills

Re-Incarnation
The Role Play to sensitize the upcoming managers with hypothetical business situations.

Parivartan
The Extension Activity to inculcate among the future managers a sense of social responsibility through well planned activities.

MAX 
The Marketing Excellence Series to promote marketing skills among students through a series of interactions with successful marketing professionals from the industry and academia.

FINEX
The Finance Excellence Series to strengthen the domain knowledge of finance and to expose students to practices in the arena of financial markets and services through a structured lecture series designed to include interactive sessions delivered by industry experts.

HREX
The HR Excellence Series to expose students to the dynamics the HR field and help them understand and further strengthen various concepts of HR through direct interaction with HR experts.

CIA 
Centre for International Affairs, to provide international exposure to its students and the faculty on a regular basis. It is designed as a promoter and coordinator of activities of L. J. Group of Institutes at the international level.

Prashikshan
Prashikshan is a unique immersion program where students undertake live projects in companies on a part-time basis.

References

External links
 L.J. Group of Institute's Official website
 L.J. Knowledge Foundation
 Gujarat Technological University
 All India Council For Technical Education

Business schools in Gujarat
Universities and colleges in Ahmedabad
All India Council for Technical Education
Educational institutions established in 2001
2001 establishments in Gujarat